Jeff Edmonds is a Canadian and American mathematician and computer scientist specializing in computational complexity theory and machine learning.

Academic career
Edmonds received his Bachelors at Waterloo in 1987 and his Ph.D. in 1993 at University of Toronto. His thesis proved lower bounds on time-space tradeoffs. He did his post-doctorate work at the ICSI in Berkeley on secure data transmission over networks for multi-media applications. He joined Department of EECS at Lassonde School of Engineering
York University in 1995.

Research
Edmonds' research interests include complexity theory, scheduling, proof systems, probability theory, combinatorics and machine learning.

Personal life
Edmonds is the son of another mathematician, Jack Edmonds.

See also 
 Edmonds–Pruhs protocol

Selected publications

.

.

.

.

.

.

.

.

References

Living people
Canadian mathematicians
Canadian computer scientists
University of Toronto alumni
Academic staff of York University
Theoretical computer scientists
1963 births